The 2016 UC Santa Barbara Gauchos baseball team represents the University of California, Santa Barbara in the 2016 NCAA Division I baseball season.  The Gauchos played their home games at Caesar Uyesaka Stadium, on campus in Santa Barbara, California.  Andrew Checketts was in his fifth season as Gauchos baseball head coach.

Rankings

References

UC Santa Barbara Gauchos baseball seasons
UC Santa Barbara Gauchos
UC Santa Barbara Gauchos
College World Series seasons